Warhammer 40,000: Shootas, Blood and Teef is a 2D run and gun platformer video game set in the Warhammer 40,000 universe, developed and published by Rogueside. It was released for Microsoft Windows, PlayStation 5 and Xbox Series X/S on 20 October 2022. In the game the player takes control of an Ork warrior leading an invasion of the planet Luteus.

Gameplay
Players can choose one of four classes for their Ork character. Health and grenades can be restored through pickups. Teef (teeth) are used as an in-game currency which can be used to purchase new weapons or cosmetic items. Ammunition is infinite but when a weapons clip is empty it has to reload. As players kill enemies a WAAAGH metre is charged which when fill increases fire rate.

Reception

Warhammer 40,000: Shootas, Blood and Teef received "generally favorable reviews" according to review aggregator Metacritic, based on 12 reviews for Windows. Softpedia gave the game 5 stars out of 5 saying that "the mechanics and the presentation are well integrated, and the combat mechanics are top notch." PC Gamer praised its replayability and art style. The short length of the game was criticised.

The Switch port was criticised for performance issues.

References

External links
 

2022 video games
MacOS games
Nintendo Switch games
PlayStation 4 games
PlayStation 5 games
Run and gun games
Video games developed in Belgium
Shootas, Blood and Teef
Windows games
Xbox One games
Xbox Series X and Series S games
Multiplayer and single-player video games